The 1933 Middle Tennessee State Teachers football team represented the Middle Tennessee State Teachers College (now known as Middle Tennessee State University) as a member of the Southern Intercollegiate Athletic Association (SIAA) during the 1933 college football season. Led by first-year head coach E. M. Waller, Middle Tennessee State Teachers compiled an overall record of 1–7–1 with a mark of 0–4 in conference play. The team's captain was Brownlow Sharpe.

Schedule

References

Middle Tennessee State Teachers
Middle Tennessee Blue Raiders football seasons
Middle Tennessee State Teachers football